Introduced in 1991, the Canon EF 75–300mm 4–5.6 lens is a telephoto zoom lens for Canon EOS single-lens reflex cameras with an EF lens mount. There are 3 basic types of the lens: the IS USM (Image Stabilization, Ultra Sonic Motor), the USM (USM, no IS) and non-USM (no USM, no IS). All 3 types are generally considered to be low-end consumer-level lenses.

The Canon EF 75–300mm f/4–5.6 IS USM Lens was Canon's first Image Stabilized lens. Even with IS it is considered a consumer-grade lens.

Description
The non-USM versions are generally considered very low grade consumer lenses with the USM versions only slightly superior in build quality and 'feel'. None of the versions (USM or not) support full-time manual (FTM) focusing. The optics are similar in the IS USM and USM versions. Except  for the USM III, the USM feature is signified by the gold "Ultrasonic Motor" text. The USM III is identified by a gold USM Logo and an adjacent gold marking of "Ultrasonic". The original USM lens caps also says "Ultrasonic" although caution is advised as lens caps are often swapped and should not be counted upon as indicative of the actual lens' features.  Ultrasonic lenses will have in small gold font "Ultrasonic" and a series of hashed lines applied completely around the lens at the forward end.

Specifications

Reviews
Canon EF 75–300 Review — Lens Reviews

External links

Canon EF lenses